The Tsnungwe (current Hupa-language orthography, own name:  - "Tse:ning-din (Ironside Mountain) People") or Tsanunghwa are a Native American people indigenous to the modern areas of the lower South Fork Trinity River, Willow Creek, Salyer, Burnt Ranch (/) and New River along the Trinity River ( 'river')  in Trinity and Humboldt County in California. The primary language was the Tsnungwe dialect of Hupa, and the secondary language was Chimariko, although spoken with a Hupa accent.  

The Tsnungwe include two sub-groups called  ('People of ') after their most important settlement and religious center, and the // ('grass, prairies-amongst-people') along New River. The Karuk living north of the Salmon River Divide called the // ('New River People').  The Norelmuk Wintu from Hayfork called the Tsnungwe Num-nor-muk.

Because their language is a dialect of the Hupa language, they are also called South Fork Hupa. Other tribal names refer to their territories occupied: South Fork Indians, Burnt Ranch, South Fork Trinity Tribe, and Kelta/Tlelwe/Hlelwe/Tlelding/Leldin Tribe or Tlohomtahhoi, Chaltasom.

Neighboring tribes to the Tsnungwe include the Yurok, Redwood Creek Hupa, Hoopa Valley Hupa, Wiyot, Chimariko, Shasta, Karuk, and Wintu.  Often times, Tsnungwe spoke many Native languages. C. Hart Merriam referred to Tsnungwe leader Saxey Kidd as "a well-known polyglot," speaker of many languages.

Federal recognition 
The Tsnungwe descendants are members of the Tsnungwe Council : recognized by both Humboldt and Trinity counties, previously recognized by the United States of America, and working to have that federally-recognized status restored.

Culture 
The traditional Tsnungwe diet included salmon, steelhead, Pacific lamprey "eels," black tail deer, and other local animals and plants.

Language 
The language of the Tsnungwe is considered a dialect of the Hupa language of the Pacific Coast Athabaskan language group of North American native languages. This language ( 'Hupa-speaking people', 'Hupa Indians') with various dialects is spoken (dialect of South Fork and New River areas);  ( 'Hoopa Valley Hupa'); ( 'Redwood Creek Hupa').

Villages

Willow Creek area villages 

South Fork Trinity area (yisinch'ing-qeh) villages 

Trinity River (South Fork – Cedar Flat area) villages 

Burnt Ranch and New River area villages 
 (Burnt Ranch, large settlement),  (near China Slide, upstream from /McDonald's at Burnt Ranch),  (McDonald Ranch, Burnt Ranch),  (at the mouth of the New River),  (Dyer's, Bell's Flat),  (also:  – Martha Dyer Ziegler's, upstream from ),  (Hoboken),  (at China Creek, also:  – China Creek),  (upstream from /Quimby),  (at the mouth of Quinby Creek, Ladd's, Thomas', Quimby),  (south of Panther Creek),  (Daily's, before: Moses Patterson),  (at the confluence of East Fork and New River),  (New River),  (at the forks of the New River upstream from Denny),  (Hupa speakers in New River villages).

References

Bald Hills War
Hupa
Native American tribes in California
Native Americans in Trinity County, California
Unrecognized tribes in the United States